Soi Pratuchai (alias: "Soi Twilight"; ,  meaning "Triumphal arch") was a gay related entertainment walkway in the Bangrak district of Bangkok, Thailand, catering mainly, though not exclusively, to foreign tourists and expatriates. While Soi Pratuchai was internationally known as a red light district for gays at the heart of Bangkok's sex industry, the city in fact has numerous gay-related red-light districts that are far more popular with Thai.

Soi Pratuchai is closed since 1 April 2019. All the buildings will be destroyed and some bars will relocate in the vicinity, while others have closed down permanently.

Location and layout 
Soi Pratuchai consists of a "7"-shaped walkway running between Surawong Road and Rama IV Road. Soi Pratuchai is within walking distance from the BTS Skytrain Silom Line's Sala Daeng Station, and MRT Blue Line's Si Lom Station.

From south to north, it has a lot of gay bars, restaurants, cafés and salons:
 Hot Male Bar
 Banana Bar
 X-Boys Bar
 X men Bar
 Maxis Restaurant
 Boys of Bangkok Bar
 Dream Boy Bar
 Fresh Beach Boyz Bar
 X size Bar
 Balls Sports Bar
 Classic Boys Club
 it has synchronized swimming shows at 22:30, 23:30 and 24:30.

Sex-related businesses 
Most Soi Pratuchai go-go bars feature boys dancing on a stage. The dancers (and even occasionally the serving staff) are generally available to customers willing to pay a bar fine to take them out of the bar; the fees for sexual services are negotiated separately. Some establishments advertising "massages" are in fact disguised brothels, and a few famous "blowjob bars" offer oral sex at the main bar or in back rooms.

Several upstairs bars still feature (technically illegal) sex shows, with boys performing various creative acts. Perhaps the most notorious of these features boys performing exotic feats involving bathing.  Some of these second-floor gay bars are run by scam artists who lure tourists with offers of low prices and later present a wildly inflated bill along with a threat of physical harm should the bill go unpaid. The Tourist Police, usually stationed at Patpong 1 and Silom Road, can help in these situations.

Some establishments in Patpong employ kathoeys (or "ladyboys") either exclusively or as part of a mixed gender staff.

The bars open at 6 pm and close at 2 am.

See also 
 Prostitution in Thailand
LGBT in Thailand

Sources

Bibliography
 
 
 
 

Neighbourhoods of Bangkok
Tourist attractions in Bangkok
Red-light districts in Thailand
Bang Rak district
Gay villages in Thailand